Happy Days - The Arena Mega Musical is an Australian musical that is a spinoff of the USA sitcom Happy Days.

Directed by David Gilmore and produced by Paul Dainty it debuted in Sydney in October 1999, subsequently playing in Melbourne, Adelelaide, Perth and Brisbane. The musical had a preview staging at the Newcastle Entertainment Centre on 7 October 1999 before its official opening on the 15th at Sydney's SuperDome.

The musical was met with mixed to poor reviews. Paul LePetit of the Sunday Telegraph wrote that it was "a relentlessly bright but banal night. Plenty of colour and movement, but little plot and a lot of over-acting." The Sun Herald's Colin Rose said that the "clichéd storyline, as old as the hills, was merely an excuse to play the great hits (27 of them) from rock'n'roll's heyday, songs such as Jailhouse Rock, Great Balls Of Fire and Johnny B Goode."  Chelsea Clarke writing in the Daily Telegraph praised the " dazzling costumes, excellent staging, bright choreography and stunning use of the impressive lighting rig." but said that from "a creative point of view, though, it lacks a great deal of what made other arena spectaculars such as Grease so successful". The Australians Stephen Brooks writes "what a shame the actual Happy Days element of the show doesn't fare as well." Ara Jansen praised the show in The West Australian, "If Happy Days doesn't put a smile on your face, then you're in need of therapy."

An Original Cast Recording album was released and was nominated for the 2000 ARIA Award for Best Cast or Show Album.

Original Australian cast
Tom Bosley - Special Guest  
Darren Coggan - Richie Cunningham  
Rod Dunbar - Understudy  
Rebecca Gibney - Miss Frost  
Max Gillies - Howard Cunningham  
Pippa Grandison - Joanie Cunningham  
Matt Hetherington - Potsie Weber  
Wendy Hughes - Marion Cunningham  
Craig Ilott - Ralph Malph  
Craig McLachlan - The Fonz  
Doug Parkinson - Delvecchio  
Jon Stevens - Frank  
Jo Beth Taylor - Laura  
Human Nature - The Naturals

Original Cast Recording track listing
 Happy Days - The Company 
 Trouble - Jon Stevens 
 Long Tall Sally - Matt Hetherington, Craig Ilott, Darren Coggan & Pippa Grandison 
 Born Too Late - Pippa Grandison 
 Great Balls of Fire - Craig McLachlan & Rebecca Gibney 
 Dream Lover - Darren Coggan 
 Poison Ivy - Human Nature
 Unchained Melody - Doug Parkinson 
 A Teenager in Love - Human Nature
 Rip It Up - Jon Stevens 
 C'mon Everybody - Craig McLachlan 
 At the Hop - The Company 
 Stand by Me - Jo Beth Taylor & Darren Coggan 
 Johnny B. Goode - Craig McLachlan & Darren Coggan 
 You Don't Own Me - Jo Beth Taylor 
 Stay - Human Nature
 Tell Him - Jo Beth Taylor & Pippa Grandison 
 Lucille - Doug Parkinson 
 Fever - Rebecca Gibney 
 Jailhouse Rock - Jon Stevens 
 Save the Last Dance for Me - Craig Ilott, Darren Coggan & Matt Hetherington 
 Shake You Outta My Head - Human Nature
 Heartbreak Hotel - Craig McLachlan 
 Rock and Roll Is Here to Stay - The Company

References

Australian musicals
1999 musicals